Davide Perona (born 4 June 1968) is an Italian former professional racing cyclist. He rode in three editions of the Tour de France and three editions of the Giro d'Italia.

References

External links
 

1968 births
Living people
Italian male cyclists
People from Verzuolo
Cyclists from Piedmont
Sportspeople from the Province of Cuneo